Pauline Bourdon (born 4 November 1995) is a French rugby union player. She played for France in the 2021 Women's Six Nations Championship, scoring thirteen points against Wales in their 53–0 win.

Bourdon was named in France's squad for the 2021 Rugby World Cup in New Zealand.

References

1995 births
Living people
Rugby union scrum-halves
French female rugby union players
Sportspeople from Limoges